Sparganothis lamberti is a species of moth of the family Tortricidae. It is found in the United States, including Alabama, Florida, Georgia, Louisiana, Mississippi, North Carolina, South Carolina, Texas and Virginia.

The wingspan is 16–21 mm. The forewing ground color is golden yellow with dark brown markings. The hindwings are uniform pale golden brown.

References

Moths described in 1986
Sparganothis